The Animals in Science Committee is an advisory non-departmental public body created by the British government in 2013 under the auspices of the Animals (Scientific Procedures) Act 1986 as part of its obligation under European Directive 2010/63/EU. It replaces the previous Animal Procedures Committee.

References 

2013 establishments in the United Kingdom
Animal testing in the United Kingdom
Animal rights
Government agencies established in 2013
Non-departmental public bodies of the United Kingdom government
Home Office (United Kingdom)